Mark Spain (b. 1971) is an Australian former child actor. His performance in the TV series The Restless Years won him a Logie.

Select Credits
My Brilliant Career (1979)
Harlequin (1980)
The Young Doctors
The Restless Years (1980)) (TV series)
Secret Valley (1980)
Ginger Meggs (1982)
Bush Christmas (1983)
A Country Practice (1984–85) (TV series)
Mad Max Beyond Thunderdome (1985)

References

External links
Mark Spain at IMDb

1971 births
Date of birth missing (living people)
Living people
21st-century Australian male actors
Australian male child actors
Australian male film actors